BB10 may refer to:

 Big Brother 10 (disambiguation), a television programme in various versions
 BlackBerry 10, a mobile operating system for the BlackBerry line of smartphones
 USS Maine (BB-10), a US Navy ship
 BB 10 (keelboat), a sailboat class
 BB10, a postcode district in the BB postcode area, England

See also
 BBX (disambiguation)